David White (April 4, 1916 – November 27, 1990) was an American stage, film, and television actor best known for playing Darrin Stephens' boss Larry Tate from 1964 to 1972 on the ABC situation comedy Bewitched.

Early life
Born on April 4, 1916, in Denver, Colorado, he later moved with his family to Phoenixville, Pennsylvania. He graduated from Los Angeles City College and began acting at the Pasadena Playhouse and the Cleveland Play House. He enlisted in the United States Marine Corps during World War II, and after his discharge, made his Broadway debut in 1949 in Leaf and Bough.

Career
White appeared on numerous television series in the 1950s and 1960s, including One Step Beyond, where he played a police officer. He made two guest appearances on the CBS courtroom drama Perry Mason. In 1960, he played Henry De Garmo in "The Case of the Madcap Modiste" and in 1963, he played newspaper editor and murderer Victor Kendall in "The Case of the Witless Witness". He also appeared in Peter Gunn, Mr. Lucky, The Untouchables, The Fugitive, Mission: Impossible, My Three Sons, Father Knows Best , Bonanza, Have Gun – Will Travel, My Favorite Martian, and Dick Tracy. He appeared in two episodes of The Twilight Zone: "I Sing the Body Electric" and "A World of Difference." Also in 1963, he appeared on Alfred Hitchcock Presents as Detective Burr in "An Out for Oscar", and as Lance Hawthorn in "The Dark Pool". Though primarily known for television work, White had several memorable supporting feature -film roles, including portraying a sleazy columnist in Sweet Smell of Success (1957), The Apartment (1960), in which he played a philandering executive, and Sunrise at Campobello (also 1960) and The Lawbreakers (1961).

In 1964, White was cast as sycophantic advertising executive Larry Tate on Bewitched, a role he played for the show's entire run (1964–1972). The character is president of the McMann & Tate advertising agency, workplace of Dick York's (and later Dick Sargent's) Darrin Stephens character. Many of the show's episodes revolved around Tate's attempts to land lucrative advertising accounts. This is the role for which he would become best-known both during his life and posthumously. Larry Tate's baby boy Jonathan was named after White's son. White also directed one season-six episode of Bewitched, "Sam’s Double Mother Trouble".

Following the end of Bewitched, White was a popular character actor on numerous television series for the next decade, including The Love Boat, Remington Steele, Adam-12, The Rockford Files, Columbo: Identity Crisis,  What's Happening!!, Rhoda, Quincy, M.E., The Odd Couple, Cagney & Lacey, Wonder Woman and Dallas. He played the role of J. Jonah Jameson in the pilot episode of the television series The Amazing Spider-Man. His final role came in 1986 on an episode of Dynasty. He also appeared in the movies The Happy Hooker Goes to Washington and Disney's Snowball Express, and had a prominent role in the 1985 version of Brewster's Millions starring Richard Pryor.

Personal life
White's first marriage was to stage actress Mary Welch. On May 31, 1958, Welch died of complications from her second pregnancy. Their son, Jonathan, died on December 21, 1988, at the age of 33, in the bombing of Pan Am Flight 103 over Lockerbie, Scotland.

White married actress Lisa Figus in 1959, with whom he had a daughter, Alexandra. They divorced and Figus remarried, date unknown.

Death
He died of a heart attack on November 27, 1990, in North Hollywood, California, aged 74.

Filmography

Television

References

External links

 
 
 

1916 births
1990 deaths
20th-century American male actors
American male film actors
American male stage actors
American male television actors
United States Marine Corps personnel of World War II
Los Angeles City College alumni
Male actors from Denver
United States Marine Corps officers
People from Phoenixville, Pennsylvania
Male actors from Pennsylvania
Bewitched
Military personnel from Pennsylvania